Weilersbach is a municipality in the  district of Forchheim in Bavaria in Germany.

References

Forchheim (district)